Leslie Alexander Walker (born 15 January 1965) is an Australian politician currently serving as member for Mundingburra in the Queensland Legislative Assembly, a position he has held since 2020. He served as a Townsville City councillor from 2004, and was Deputy Mayor of Townsville from 2016 to 2020.

Walker won preselection for Mundingburra following the retirement of the sitting member, Labor frontbencher Coralee O'Rourke.

On 16 January 2021, Walker was knocked unconscious at Townsville's Mad Cow Tavern nightclub while celebrating his 56th birthday. Police issued Walker with an $800 public nuisance infringement notice and was banned from the town's pubs, nightclubs and restaurants for a period of 10 days. No charges were laid.

On 30 July 2021, Walker was charged with common assault on a former independent candidate at the 2017 Queensland state election for the Thuringowa electorate, Stephen Lane, who is the son of a former Thuringowa City and Townsville City Councillor Jenny Lane.

Walker appeared in the Townsville Magistrates Court on 13 August 2021. Walker did not enter a plea, but said outside the court that he would contest the charges.

On 27 August, Walker's lawyer appeared on his behalf and entered no plea, simply stating that the case is “subject to case conferencing". The matter was adjourned to 3 September 2021.

Premier Annastacia Palaszczuk stated she was "disappointed" by the events, and confirmed that Walker had agreed to stand down from his role on the Transport and Resources Committee and from his role as a Temporary Speaker."

On 5 November, Walker was acquitted, with a magistrate describing the case as a "waste of time".. Walker was subsequenty resumed his parliamentary roles, including as a member of the Transport and Resources Committee.

References

Living people
Members of the Queensland Legislative Assembly
Australian Labor Party members of the Parliament of Queensland
1965 births
21st-century Australian politicians
Labor Right politicians